Catoptria cabardinica is a species of moth in the family Crambidae. It is found in Russia.

References

Moths described in 1999
Crambini
Moths of Europe